Artemisa Municipal Museum is a museum located in the Martí street in Artemisa, Cuba. It was established as museum on 28 January 1982.

The museum holds collections on history and weaponry.

See also 
 List of museums in Cuba

References 

Museums in Cuba
Museum
Buildings and structures in Artemisa Province
Museums established in 1982
1982 establishments in Cuba
20th-century architecture in Cuba